Melampsoridium is a genus of fungi belonging to the family Pucciniastraceae.

The species of this genus are found in Eurasia, Northern America and Australia.

Species

Species:

Melampsoridium alni 
Melampsoridium alni-firmae 
Melampsoridium alni-pendulae

References

Pucciniales
Basidiomycota genera